General elections were held in Lebanon between 23 August and 11 October 1992, the first since 1972. Independent candidates won the majority of seats, although most of them were considered members of various blocs. Voter turnout was 30.3%.

Results

Of the 92 independent MPs, 68 were considered to be members of various blocs:
12 in the Berri bloc (plus the five Amal Movement MPs)
11 in the Hrawi bloc
10 in the Salim el-Hoss bloc
9 in the Karami bloc
6 in the Frangieh bloc
5 in the Jumblatt bloc (plus the five Progressive Socialist Party MPs)
4 in the Hezbollah bloc (plus the eight Hezbollah MPs)
4 in the Murr bloc
3 in the Hariri bloc
3 in the Armenian Revolutionary Federation bloc (plus one MP from the party)
1 in the Hubayqa bloc (plus the Promise Party MP)

References

Lebanon
1992 in Lebanon
Elections in Lebanon
Election and referendum articles with incomplete results